The Dove River is a river in the Canterbury region of New Zealand. It rises near Mount Te Kooti and runs southward, draining the Big Island Hills to its west and the Tekoa Range to the east.

References

Rivers of Canterbury, New Zealand
Rivers of New Zealand